Paulo Brossard de Souza Pinto (23 October 1924 – 12 April 2015) was a Brazilian jurist and politician. Born in Bagé, Rio Grande do Sul, he graduated in Law and served several terms as a parliamentarian in his state and in the National Congress as well. He also was a member of the Supreme Federal Court and the Superior Electoral Court of Brazil.

Brossard was born in 1924 at Bagé, Rio Grande do Sul. He studied law at the Federal University of Rio Grande do Sul and specialized itself on constitutional and civil law areas, starting his career as a teacher at the Pontifical Catholic University of Rio Grande do Sul, before his début as a politician. Later than, he was elected as a lawmaker for the State Assembly of Rio Grande do Sul, from there to the National Congress of Brazil, first as a representative and as a senator at last.

He ran for the Vice Presidency of Brazil in the 1978 indirect elections for the MDB ticket (General Euler Bentes as President), during the Brazilian military government. He was defeated by Aureliano Chaves, while João Figueiredo was elected as President of Brazil.

He played an important role on the crisis that arose when President elect Tancredo Neves could not be able to take office in 1985, as the first civilian citizen to bear such position after the 1964 Brazilian coup d'état. Confusion and discrepancies were spreading many different understandings on the Brazilian laws as Neves was unable to take office, at the same time his running mate for vice presidency, José Sarney, was empowered as acting president. He strongly supported Sarney's ability and rightness to exercise the presidential powers, stating "this is the reason why vice presidents exist". (In the aftermath, Tancredo Neves has died, never taking the oath, and Sarney completed his tenure).

He died on 12 April 2015 at his home in Porto Alegre, at the age of 90.

References 

1924 births
2015 deaths
Supreme Federal Court of Brazil justices
Ministers of Justice of Brazil
Brazilian Democratic Movement politicians
Liberator Party (Brazil) politicians
Brazilian jurists
Federal University of Rio Grande do Sul alumni
People from Bagé
Members of the Federal Senate (Brazil)
Members of the Chamber of Deputies (Brazil) from Rio Grande do Sul
Members of the Legislative Assembly of Rio Grande do Sul
Candidates for Vice President of Brazil